The 1924 Florida gubernatorial election was held on November 4, 1924. Democratic nominee John W. Martin defeated Republican nominee William R. O'Neal with 82.79% of the vote.

Primary elections
Primary elections were held on June 3, 1924.

Democratic primary

Candidates
John W. Martin, former Mayor of Jacksonville
Sidney Johnston Catts, former Governor
Frank E. Jennings, former Speaker of the State House of Representatives
Worth W. Trammell, former State Representative  
Charles H. Spencer

Results

General election

Candidates
John W. Martin, Democratic
William R. O'Neal, Republican, businessman, trustee of Rollins College, president of the Orlando City Council, anti-racism activist.

Results

References

1924
Florida
Gubernatorial